Ashes to the Wind is a 1942 Argentine film directed by Luis Saslavsky.

Cast

The cast is:

 Berta Singerman 
 María Duval
 Luis Arata 
 Santiago Arrieta 
 Tita Merello 
 Pedro López Lagar 
 Alita Román 
 Olinda Bozán 
 Oscar Valliceli 
 Malisa Zini 
 José Squinquel 
 Marcos Caplán
 Tilda Thamar  
 Hedy Krilla  
 Percival Murray  
 Enrique René Cossa  
 Guillermo Pedemonte  
 Salvador Sinaí  
 Haydeé Larroca  
 Bertha Moss  
 Luis Vigneri  
 Carlos Geraldi  
 Pedro Fiorito  
 Alberto Adhemar

External links
 
 Director: Luis Saslavsky

References

1942 films
1940s Spanish-language films
Argentine black-and-white films
1942 drama films
Argentine anthology films
Argentine drama films
Films directed by Luis Saslavsky
1940s Argentine films